Ambroziak is a Polish surname. People with the surname include:

Ewa Ambroziak (born 1950), Polish athlete
Jeffrey Ambroziak (born 1966), American cartographer, inventor, and attorney
Peter Ambroziak (born 1971), Canadian former professional ice hockey player, former coach and executive
Sylwester Ambroziak (born 1964), Polish sculptor
Zdzisław Ambroziak (1944–2004), Polish volleyball player

Polish-language surnames